The 2020 Phoenix Rising FC season is the club's seventh season in the USL Championship and their fourth as Rising FC. They are the defending USL Championship regular season champions.

Competitions

Friendlies

All times from this point on Mountain Standard Time (UTC-07:00)

USL Championship

Results by round

Matches

Group table

Conference table

USL Championship Playoffs

Conference Playoffs

USL Championship Final 
The Final was cancelled the day before because several Tampa Bay players and staff tested positive for COVID-19. No league champion was chosen.

U.S. Open Cup
The U.S. Open Cup was cancelled.

Roster

Transfers

Loan in

Loan out

Statistics

Goalkeepers

See also 
 2020 in American soccer
 2020 USL Championship season
 Phoenix Rising FC
 Casino Arizona Field

Notes

References 

2020
Phoenix Rising FC
Phoenix Rising FC
Phoenix Rising FC
Phoenix Rising FC